Mulatto is a racial classification to refer to people of mixed black African and white European ancestry.

Mulatto may also refer to:

Arts, entertainment, and media
 Mulatto (play), a 1935 American play by Langston Hughes
 Il Mulatto, a 1950 Italian drama film
 Tragic Mulatto, a former American punk rock band
 Le Mulâtre (The Mulatto), an 1837 short story written by Victor Séjour

Other uses
 Mulatto Mountain, a mountain in Ashe County, North Carolina, United States
 Cultural mulatto, a concept introduced by Trey Ellis referring to a black person who is highly educated and a part of the middle or upper-middle class
 Tragic mulatto, a stereotypical fictional character
 Latto (born 1998), American rapper, formerly known by her stage name Mulatto

See also
 Mulato (disambiguation)